Let's Go to Bed may refer to:

 "Let's Go to Bed" (The Cure song), 1982
 "Let's Go to Bed" (No Angels song), 2002
 Let's Go to Bed (film), a 1972 Shaw Brothers film